SM02 (model Ls40) is a Polish series of diesel shunting locomotives used by PKP. 12 of the locomotives were introduced into PKP after 1954. It is the first diesel locomotive of Polish production.

History
SM02 was finally designed at the beginning of the 1950s and the production started in 1952 in Fablok, Chrzanów. Before 1960 those locomotives were named Lo1xx in PKP, where xx stands for numbers. Those machines did not find much use in PKP, mainly because of poor performance features.

Ls40 locomotives were nonetheless widely used in the industry. During the service S64L engines proved to be insufficient for the tasks of this locomotive, so a few last items had been equipped with more powerful S324HL motors. Meanwhile, several older locomotives had their engines replaced during servicing.

Preservation
Several items of Ls40 locomotive stay in service in industry, but they are being withdrawn systematically. Ls40-5438 engine serves as an exhibit in Skansen Parowozownia Kościerzyna museum and Ls40-4572 was bought by Polskie Stowarzyszenie Miłośników Kolei (En.: Polish Society of Railway Enthusiasts) from Grodziskie Zakłady Farmaceutyczne "Polfa" in Grodzisk Mazowiecki on June 30, 1995.

Technical data
SM02 is a B locomotive, which means there are two powered axles under the unit. These axles are not articulated relative to other parts of the locomotive. The locomotive is propelled by a diesel engine and the power was supplied to axles through mechanical transmission.

References

Railway locomotives introduced in 1952
Diesel locomotives of Poland
B locomotives
Standard gauge locomotives of Poland